For the 1981 Vuelta a España, the field consisted of 80 riders; 55 finished the race.

By rider

By nationality

References

1981 Vuelta a España
1981